Big Ivy is an unincorporated community in Hardin County, Tennessee. Big Ivy is located southeast of Savannah and north of the Alabama border.

References

Unincorporated communities in Hardin County, Tennessee
Unincorporated communities in Tennessee